The Ramblers is the name of a jazz and dance music orchestra from the Netherlands, active since 1926. It was a popular Dutch radio big band in the 1930s and 1940s and instrumental in popularizing jazz music in the Low Countries.

Among the group's members over the years were Theo Uden Masman (bandleader from 1926 until 1964), Louis De Vries, Piet Noordijk, Ack van Rooyen, and Jozef Cleber. Because The Ramblers had played for the Germans during the Nazi occupation of the Netherlands between 1940 and 1945, Theo Uden Masman was not allowed to lead his big band for a period of one year, until 5 May 1946. The band appeared on the radion during the 1960s with Joke Bruijs singing. The last performance of Theo Uden Masman and the Ramblers was on 11 April 1964.

In 1974 Jack Bulterman and Marcel Thielemans relaunched The Ramblers.

Their 1941 song "Dag Schatteboutje" was featured in the 2016 film Riphagen.

References

Dutch jazz ensembles
Musical groups established in 1926